Rear Admiral Jonathan Patrick Pentreath,  (born 2 March 1966) is a retired senior officer of the Royal Navy. He commanded 845 Naval Air Squadron from 2001 to 2003, including during the Battle of Al Faw in the Iraq War, and later commanded Commando Helicopter Force (2009–11) and Royal Naval Air Station, Yeovilton (2015–17). He was Commander Joint Helicopter Command from April 2017 until March 2020 when he retired from the Royal Navy.

Early life and education
Pentreath was born on 2 March 1966 in Plymstock, Devon, England. He father was Captain David Pentreath, a decorated Royal Navy officer. He was educated at Sandroyd School, Haileybury and Imperial Service College, a public school in Hertfordshire, and City, University of London.

Naval career
Pentreath joined the Royal Navy in 1984. He became Commanding Officer 845 Naval Air Squadron in 2001 and saw action at the Battle of Al Faw in March 2003 during the Iraq War, for which he was awarded a Queen's Commendation for Valuable Service. He went on to be Commander Air of the amphibious assault ship  in 2006, Commanding Officer Commando Helicopter Force in 2008 and Capability Director at Joint Helicopter Command in July 2012. After that he became Commanding Officer Royal Naval Air Station Yeovilton in September 2015, and Commander Joint Helicopter Command in April 2017. He handed over command of Joint Helicopter Command in March 2020 and retired from the Royal Navy on 1 August 2020.

Pentreath was appointed Officer of the Order of the British Empire (OBE) in the 2012 New Year Honours and Companion of the Order of the Bath (CB) in the 2019 Birthday Honours.

References

Companions of the Order of the Bath
Living people
Officers of the Order of the British Empire
Recipients of the Commendation for Valuable Service
Royal Navy rear admirals
People educated at Sandroyd School
Royal Navy personnel of the Iraq War
Royal Navy personnel of the War in Afghanistan (2001–2021)
1966 births
People educated at Haileybury and Imperial Service College